Peter Meong Rhee (born September 18, 1961) is an American surgeon, medical professor, and military veteran. During his 24 years in the United States Navy, Rhee served as a battlefield casualty physician in Afghanistan and Iraq.

Formerly a Professor of Surgery and the Chief of Trauma, Critical Care, and Burn and Emergency Surgery at the University of Arizona College of Medicine until 2016, he then served as the Chief of Surgery at the Marcus Trauma Center at Grady Memorial Hospital in Atlanta, Georgia. Currently he is the Chief of Acute Care Surgery and Trauma at the Westchester Medical Center in Valhalla, New York.  He was a tenured Professor of Surgery at the University of Arizona until 2016.  Now he is Professor of Surgery at the Uniformed Services University of the Health Sciences in Bethesda Maryland, Morehouse School of Medicine and is a tenured Professor of Surgery at the New York Medical College in Valhalla, New York. He rose to national prominence when he served as the attending physician to U.S. Representative Gabby Giffords of Arizona, as well as other victims, following the 2011 Tucson shooting.

Biography

Early life and education
Born in Seoul, South Korea, Rhee lived for several years in Uganda where his father, a surgeon, worked in a clinic in Torroro, Uganda. The elder Rhee moved the family to the United States when his son was 10 to get a better education. The family was raised in a small Pennsylvania town, south of Pittsburgh. His father was an anesthesiologist at Uniontown Hospital. The younger Rhee graduated in 1979 from Laurel Highlands High School in Fayette County.
In 1983, he received his Bachelor of Science degree in Health Systems Engineering from the Georgia Institute of Technology. In 1987, Rhee earned his medical degree from the Uniformed Services University of Health Sciences F. Edward Hebert School of Medicine.  He also earned a master's degree in Public Health from the University of Washington Department of Health Services. In 1999, he earned a diploma in Medical Care of Catastrophes from the Society of Apothecaries of London.

Military service

Rhee is a 24-year veteran of the U.S. Navy. During a trip to China in 1998, he was selected to accompany U.S. President Bill Clinton as his designated surgeon. In 2001, Rhee became one of the first American military surgeons to be deployed in Afghanistan at Camp Rhino, the first forward operating base to be established during Operation Enduring Freedom. In 2005, Rhee was deployed to Iraq, where he established the first surgical unit in Ramadi. His service awards include the Defense Meritorious Service Medal and the Navy Commendation Medal.

As the Director of the Navy Trauma Training Center at Los Angeles County+USC Medical Center, Rhee became involved in an interbranch disagreement between the Army and Navy regarding the adoption of new hemostatic agents designed for battlefield treatment of severe bleeding. While the Army had adopted blood-clotting bandage called HemCon, the Navy and Marines instead opted for a different product called QuikClot. After testing HemCon at the Navy Trauma Training Center, Rhee concluded in December 2005: "I've tried every one of these products, many times, on many different kinds of wounds. For big-time bleeding – and that's what we're really worrying about here – HemCon doesn't work." Though Rhee preferred QuikClot, he expressed reservations over its commercialization in 2003 because of the potential for misuse by untrained consumers.

Rhee was appointed as Professor of Surgery and Molecular Cellular Biology at the Uniformed Services University of the Health Sciences and continues to consult for the Office of Naval Research and the Marine Corps War Fighting Laboratory.

Civilian medical career
Rhee worked in the trauma centers at the Harborview Medical Center in Seattle and the Washington Hospital Center in Washington, D.C. In September 2007, he became the Chief of Trauma and Critical Care and Professor of Surgery at the University of Arizona in Tucson, Arizona. By that time, he had published over 200 articles in medical journals. In July 2009, the University Medical Center was designated a Level 1 Trauma Center by the American College of Surgeons. Rhee stated that the center had become ranked among the top 10 in the nation.

2011 Tucson shooting

In January 2011, Rhee became the subject of national media attention as the attending trauma physician for U.S. Representative Gabby Giffords, who had been shot in the head near Tucson. Rhee was out jogging at the time of the shooting and had to rush three miles home and go to the hospital. Rhee also held press conferences to update the public on her condition. Upon observing that Giffords was still able to squeeze a doctor's hand, which most gunshot victims are unable to do, he became confident of her chances. Rhee remarked, "She has a 101 percent chance of surviving. She will not die."

On January 12, 2011, Rhee was met with cheers as he arrived at the McKale Center, while still dressed in scrubs and a white coat from the medical center, for a memorial speech by U.S. President Barack Obama.
Rhee was also invited to sit with First Lady Michelle Obama during a joint session of the United States Congress for the 2011 State of the Union Address on January 25.

In his memoir TRAUMA RED: The Making of a Surgeon in War and in America's Cities, Rhee recalled that "challenging, exhausting, exhilarating, frustrating, heartbreaking, satisfying, bloody, bloody, bloody day at the office," and the path that led him there. From his youth in South Korea and Uganda—where he once watched his surgeon father remove a spear from a man's belly—to frontline surgery in Iraq and Afghanistan, to trauma centers on the urban battlefields of Los Angeles and Washington, D.C.

"It took a long time to be convinced that I should write this book," Rhee stated. He felt that the book would be looked upon as being egotistical by his professional peers. He states that he wrote the book to document from the medical provider point of view what actually happened when the Congresswoman was shot in the brain and so that others could learn what a trauma surgeon is.

Personal life
Rhee met his wife, Emily, as he was completing his residency at the University of California, Irvine. They have two children.

On October 13, 2011,  Rhee and his wife attended the State Dinner for the Korean President.

On May 12, 2012, Rhee delivered the commencement speech to the University of Arizona Class of 2012. The theme of the speech was "Today is a Good Day." He spoke primarily about his experiences traveling, why today is a good day, and how to look at things optimistically.

In April 2012, Rhee was selected as the Hometown Hero for the Thunder and Lightning over Arizona open house at Davis-Monthan Air Force Base. Rhee was able to fly with the Thunderbirds in an F-16 Fighting Falcon Jet.

Titles
 American Board of Surgery
 Fellow of the American College of Surgeons
 Fellow of the Critical Care Medicine
 Diploma in the Medical Care of Catastrophes

Research interests
Rhee's areas of research interest include hemorrhagic shock; suspended animation for trauma; hemostatic agents; resuscitation immunology and formulation of resuscitation fluids; traumatic brain injury; transfusion and coagulopathy; trauma training; and advanced portable electronic medical devices including those for communication and documentation. His national interests include improved trauma treatment on Indian reservations, improved gun control and prevention of gun violence, suicide prevention and finally improved disaster preparedness. He is a founding member of the Tactical Combat Casualty Care Committee (TCCC) and his research interests have continued to focus on saving combat casualties. He has served on numerous National steering committees and national trauma research committees including the Defense Health Board's Subcommittee on Trauma & Injury, as well as the Federal Drug Administration's blood products advisory committee, the Resuscitation Outcomes Consortium's protocol review committee and the drug safety and monitoring board.

See also

 List of medical specialty colleges in the United States

Publications
He has authored over 387 peer-reviewed publications and 30 book chapters and five books. His H index is 85 (Google scholar) and his publications are listed at: https://www.ncbi.nlm.nih.gov/myncbi/collections/bibliography/48789648/

References

 Rhee P, Eifert S, Talon E, Anderson D, Stanton K, Koustova E, Ling G, Burris D, Kaufmann C, Mongan P, Rich MN, Taylor M, Sun L. (2000). "Induced Hypothermia During Emergency Department Thoracotomy: an Animal Model". Journal of Trauma Injury and Critical Care. 48:439–450.

External links

 Dr. Peter Rhee: 5 Facts About Obama's State of the Union Guest at AOL News

1961 births
Living people
United States Navy personnel of the Iraq War
United States Navy personnel of the War in Afghanistan (2001–2021)
American military personnel of Korean descent
United States Navy Medical Corps officers
American traumatologists
South Korean emigrants to the United States
Georgia Tech alumni
People from Seoul
Military personnel from Tucson, Arizona
Uniformed Services University of the Health Sciences alumni
University of Arizona faculty
University of California, Irvine alumni
University of Washington School of Public Health alumni
United States Navy captains